Kher Khereh (also Romanized as Kherkhereh; also known as Jazīreh Kher Khereh and Beyt-e Yāsīn) is a village in Bahmanshir-e Shomali Rural District, in the Central District of Abadan County, Khuzestan Province, Iran. As of the 2006 census, its population was 570, with 106 families.

References 

Populated places in Abadan County